Harold Jeter (born May 17, 1945) is an American former professional basketball player. He played in the American Basketball Association for the Washington Caps in five games in March 1970.

References

External links
Highland Junior College Hall of Fame profile

1945 births
Living people
American men's basketball players
Basketball players from Pennsylvania
Drake Bulldogs men's basketball players
Guards (basketball)
Highland Community College (Kansas) alumni
Junior college men's basketball players in the United States
People from Aliquippa, Pennsylvania
Washington Caps players